Freeze the Atlantic is the eponymously-titled second studio album by the Farnborough-based rock band of the same name. The album was produced and mixed by drummer Guy Davis and released on 16 June 2014 through Alcopop! Records. It is the first record with Liv Puente as the bands permanent vocalist and the last album to feature Sean Shreeve who would go on to leave the band at the end of 2014.

Track listing

Personnel
Freeze the Atlantic
Liv Puente - vocals
Andy Gilmour - guitar/vocals
Tom Stevens - guitar/piano/vocals
Sean Shreeve - bass/vocals
Guy Davis - drums/percussion

Guest vocalists
 Chris Knott – vocals on "Bound"

References

External links 

2014 albums
Alcopop! Records albums
Freeze the Atlantic albums